2017 in film is an overview of events, including the highest-grossing films, award ceremonies, festivals, a list of films released, and notable deaths in 2017.

Evaluation of the year
Richard Brody of The New Yorker observed that for 2017, "the most important event in the world of movies was the revelation, in The New York Times and The New Yorker, of sexual abuse by Harvey Weinstein, and the resulting liberation of the long-stifled voices of the people who had been abused by him or other powerful figures in the movie business, and, for that matter, in other arts and industries, too." He emphasizes that in effect, "[w]hat's missing from the year-end list, and from the era in movies, isn't only the unmade work by these filmmakers but the artistry and the careers of cast and crew members who would have been in their unrealized films."

Highest-grossing films

The top films released in 2017 by worldwide gross are as follows:

Star Wars: The Last Jedi, Beauty and the Beast, The Fate of the Furious, and Despicable Me 3 have each grossed over $1 billion, making them among the highest-grossing films of all time, with the latter being the fourth-highest-grossing animated film.

Wolf Warrior 2, a Chinese film, became the first non-Hollywood film to be listed on the all-time worldwide top 100 box office.

Split, by M. Night Shyamalan, was the year's most profitable film in terms of return on investment (ROI), having generated over 2,000% ROI. It is the 11th film to cross 2,000% ROI, and the first film to do so since 2015.

2017 box office records
In China, the country recorded a new single-day record as well as an all-time admission high on Saturday, January 28, with over ¥755 million (US$110 million) registering an admission of over 21 million moviegoers, beating the previous record of ¥647 million ($98.4 million) and 17 million admissions set the previous year. Both records were set on the first day of the Chinese New Year.
In May, China had its first consecutive monthly gain in box office revenue in more than a year, led by Indian film Dangal, followed by Hollywood film Pirates of the Caribbean: Dead Men Tell No Tales.
2017 has been a record year for non-Hollywood foreign films in the Chinese market, with the success of films such as India's Dangal, Thailand's Bad Genius and Spain's Contratiempo. , non-Hollywood imports account for 72% ($519.7 million) of the year's foreign film box office revenue so far ($723 million), with Dangal alone accounting for 27% ($195.8 million).
The Marvel Cinematic Universe became the first film franchise to gross more than $11 billion with the release of Guardians of the Galaxy Vol. 2. With the subsequent release of Spider-Man: Homecoming, it became the first film franchise to gross more than $12 billion, and with the release of Thor: Ragnarok, the MCU became the first film franchise to gross more than $13 billion. It also became the first film franchise to release three movies in one year that all made over $800 million worldwide and opened to over $100 million domestically (through the aforementioned entries).
The Despicable Me franchise became the highest-grossing animated franchise ever ($3.6 billion), surpassing the Shrek franchise; it also became the first animated franchise to have two films hit over $1 billion.
With Star Wars: The Last Jedi, Beauty and the Beast, and Wonder Woman, 2017 was the first year since 1958 (South Pacific, Auntie Mame, Cat on a Hot Tin Roof) in which the top 3 highest grossing domestic films were female-led.
Wolf Warrior 2 was a massive commercial success and became the highest-grossing Chinese film ever released. The film broke numerous box office records, including the biggest single-day gross for a Chinese film as well as the fastest film to cross the RMB 2 billion, 3 billion, 4 billion and 5 billion box office marks. It also became the fastest film to surpass US$500 million and the first film to gross more than US$600 million at the Chinese box office. The film was the sixth highest-grossing film of 2017 at US$874 million, making it the 54th-highest-grossing film worldwide. It is the first and only Chinese film ever to be included in the list of 100 all-time highest-grossing films worldwide. It was selected as the Chinese entry for the Best Foreign Language Film at the 90th Academy Awards.

Studio records
Walt Disney Studios became the first studio ever to reach $6 billion at the global box office in consecutive years (following a $7.6 billion gross in 2016), and the first studio to reach $5 billion globally in three consecutive years.

Film records
In China, the film Wolf Warrior 2 became the fastest film to reach 2 and 3 billion yuan, as well as the first to reach 4 and 5 billion yuan. It is China's highest-grossing film, as well as the highest-grossing non-Hollywood film.
Dangal became the highest-grossing Indian film, crossing  worldwide, making it the first Indian film to gross $300 million worldwide. Dangal is also the highest-grossing sports film. Most of its gross ($194.71million) came from China, where it became the highest-grossing non-Hollywood foreign film, surpassing Japanese anime film Your Name. Dangal also became the highest-grossing non-English foreign film in any single market (China), surpassing the gross of previous record holder Crouching Tiger, Hidden Dragon (2000) which grossed $128million in North America.
It also became the first Indian movie to gross more than $200 million.
Resident Evil: The Final Chapter scored the biggest three-day (Friday to Sunday) opening in China with an estimated ¥636.9 million ($92.7 million) debut, according to official local sources. This toppled the previous record holders Transformers: Age of Extinction (¥632 million) and Captain America: Civil War (¥628 million).
Beauty and the Beast broke Batman v Superman: Dawn of Justices records ($166 million) for the highest weekend debut in March ($174.8 million) and for a spring release, The Loraxs record ($70.4 million) for the highest weekend debut for a musical film, Pitch Perfect 2s record ($69.2 million) for the highest weekend debut for a live-action musical film, and Harry Potter and the Deathly Hallows – Part 2s record ($169.2 million) for the highest weekend debut for a live-action fantasy film.
The Fate of the Furious broke Jurassic Worlds record ($316.6 million) of largest foreign weekend debut ($432.3 million) and Star Wars: The Force Awakens record ($529 million) of largest worldwide weekend debut ($541 million).
Wonder Woman, directed by Patty Jenkins, grossed $103.3 million in its opening weekend, breaking the record for a female-directed film previously held by Fifty Shades of Grey, directed by Sam Taylor-Johnson ($85.2 million on 13–15 February 2015); the film also became the highest-grossing World War I film, surpassing War Horse ($79.9 million on 25–28 December 2011). It also became the highest-grossing superhero origin film. Overall, it is the highest-grossing female-directed film, surpassing Phyllida Lloyd's Mamma Mia! ($609.8 million).
Despicable Me 3 broke The Twilight Saga: Eclipses 4,468 theater count with a theater count of 4,529 theaters in its first week. It would have six more theaters in its second week, going to 4,535 theaters.
Dunkirk grossed $525.6 million, making it the highest-grossing World War II film of all time, surpassing Saving Private Ryan ($481.8 million).
It broke Hotel Transylvania 2s record for largest September opening weekend ($48.5 million), and Gravity's record for largest fall opening weekend ($55.8 million) when it opened to $123.4 million and, subsequently, went on to become the unadjusted highest-grossing horror film in history, surpassing The Sixth Sense ($672.8 million). It is currently the third-highest-grossing R-rated film, after Deadpool and The Matrix Reloaded.
Star Wars: The Last Jedi grossed $104.7 million in its opening day, becoming only the second movie (along with Star Wars: The Force Awakens) to gross more than $100 million in a single day, and making the Star Wars franchise the first film series to include two movies that recorded $100 million grossing days. On December 30, Last Jedi surpassed a billion dollars at the global box office, making Star Wars the first franchise to release three consecutive billion-dollar-grossing films and the first franchise to release billion-dollar-grossing films in three consecutive years (along with 2015's Force Awakens and 2016's Rogue One). Last Jedi also became the fourth Star Wars film to gross more than $1 billion, tying the Star Wars franchise with the Marvel Cinematic Universe for most billion-dollar films within a single franchise.
2017 breaks 2016's record for films that crossed over $500 million, with nineteen: the ten films in the table above, as well as Coco, Pirates of the Caribbean: Dead Men Tell No Tales, It, Justice League, Logan, Transformers: The Last Knight, Kong: Skull Island, The Boss Baby, and Dunkirk. 2017 also broke 2016's record of films that crossed over $600 million with sixteen (Coco, Pirates of the Caribbean: Dead Men Tell No Tales, It, Justice League, Logan, and Transformers: The Last Knight have all grossed over $600 million). It also surpasses 2016's record of films that earned over $700 million worldwide with thirteen consecutive films. (Coco, Pirates of the Caribbean: Dead Men Tell No Tales, and It have grossed over $700 million.) It additionally surpasses 2016's record of films that earned over $800 million worldwide with eleven, those being the ten in the table above and Coco (it also becomes the first year in history where every one of the top 10 highest-grossing films grossed over $800 million worldwide).

Events

Award ceremonies

Awards

Notes

Festivals 
List of some of the film festivals for 2017 that have been accredited by the International Federation of Film Producers Associations (FIAPF).

2017 films 
The list of films released in 2017, arranged by country, are as follows:
 List of American films of 2017
 List of Argentine films of 2017
 List of Australian films of 2017
 List of Bangladeshi films of 2017
 List of Brazilian films of 2017
 List of British films of 2017
 List of Chinese films of 2017
 List of French films of 2017
 List of Hong Kong films of 2017
 List of Indian films of 2017
 List of Assamese films of 2017
 List of Bollywood films of 2017
 List of Punjabi films of 2017
 List of Bengali films of 2017
 List of Gujarati films of 2017
 List of Kannada films of 2017
 List of Malayalam films of 2017
 List of Marathi films of 2017
 List of Tamil films of 2017
 List of Telugu films of 2017
 List of Tulu films of 2017
 List of Japanese films of 2017
 List of Pakistani films of 2017
 List of Portuguese films of 2017
 List of Russian films of 2017
 List of South Korean films of 2017
 List of Spanish films of 2017
 List of Turkish films of 2017

Deaths

Film debuts
 Yahya Abdul-Mateen II – The Vanishing of Sidney Hall
 Cameron Seely – The Greatest Showman

Notes

References

 
Film by year
2017-related lists